Aila Johanna Sinisalo is a Finnish science fiction and fantasy writer. She studied comparative literature and drama, amongst other subjects, at the University of Tampere. Professionally she worked in the advertising business, rising to the level of marketing designer.

An important figure in the Finnish science fiction scene in the late 1980s and early '90s (winning a rare back-to-back collection of Atorox Awards for short fiction in the genre), she was also the first Finnish science fiction writer to make a mainstream breakthrough by breaking genre barriers.

Fiction
Sinisalo was awarded the Finlandia Prize for literature in 2000 for her first novel, Ennen päivänlaskua ei voi (translated as Not Before Sundown in 2003 and again as Troll — A Love Story in 2004 for the American market). The novel has been translated into several languages. Movie rights were acquired by Carter Smith in 2006.

An English translation of Linnunaivot was published in 2010 by Peter Owen Publishers under the title Birdbrain (translated by David Hackston).

She has named the 1967 novel Friday, or, The Other Island by French writer Michel Tournier as a major influence on her career.

Screenwriting

She is also the screenwriter of Energia Productions Iron Sky movie, a sci-fi comedy set in 2018.

Awards
Sinisalo was awarded the Finlandia Prize for literature in 2000 for Ennen päivänlaskua ei voi (Not Before Sundown, also known as Troll — A Love Story).  The novel was also awarded The James Tiptree Jr. award in 2004.
She was nominated for a Nebula Award in 2009 for the short story "Baby Doll". 
She has won the Atorox Award for best Finnish science fiction short story in 1986, 1989, 1993, 1994, 1997, and 2001
The Core of the Sun won the 2017 Prometheus Award for Best Novel.
Pro Finlandia medal, Order of the Lion of Finland, 2022

Bibliography

Novels 
Ennen päivänlaskua ei voi, (Tammi, 2000)
British Edition Not Before Sundown (Peter Owen Publishers, 2003); American edition Troll — A Love Story (Grove Atlantic, 2004)
Sankarit, (Tammi 2003)
Kädettömät kuninkaat ja muita häiritseviä tarinoita, (Teos 2005), short story collection
Lasisilmä, (Teos 2006)
Linnunaivot, (Teos 2008)
In English as Birdbrain (Peter Owen Publishers, 2011)
Möbiuksen maa, (Teos 2010)
Enkelten verta, (Teos 2011).
In English as The Blood of Angels (Peter Owen Publishers 2014)
Auringon ydin, (Teos 2013)
In English as The Core of the Sun (Grove Atlantic 2016).
Vieraat, (Karisto 2020).

Short fiction
She has published over 40 short stories, most of them fantasy and science fiction in various in sci fi magazines, journals and women's magazines. Her work has also appeared in the following anthologies:

Vuosirengas 74 (1974)
short stories Kilometripylväät and Jäinen kaupunki
Jäinen vaeltaja (1986)
 short stories Tarina kuolleesta metsästä and Sorsapuisto
Atoroxin perilliset (1988)
 short stories Hanna, Yövesi and Suklaalaput
Ensimmäinen yhteys (1988)
short story Transit
Illan tähti yksinäinen (1991) edited by Raija Hämäläinen
short story Illan tähti yksinäinen
Kultainen naamio (1993)
short story Me vakuutamme sinut
Onnellinen kuolema (1996)
mini novel Tango merellä
Linnées boreales (2001)
short story  (French) Le Transit
Kärlek på finska (2002)
short story (Swedish) Låset
Intohimosta rikokseen (2002)
short story Baby Doll
Utopiae 2005 (2005)
novelli (French) Baby Doll

Editor
Anthology Verkon silmässä (Tammi, 2005)
 Selection of short stories about the internet from several writers.
The Dedalus Book of Finnish Fantasy (Dedalus Books, 2005)
Anthology in English, a selection of Finnish speculative fiction from the 19th century to the present day, translated by David Hackston.
co-edited with Toni Jerrman, Giants at the End of the World: A Showcase of the Finnish Weird (Worldcon-75, 2017)
Anthology in English, a selection of Finnish weird fiction

Television
Toinen todellisuus, TV2, 1991
Maa on litteä, TV2, 1992
Tulevaisuuden kuvia, TV2, 1995
Ainoa elämä, TV2, 1997
Elämän suola, TV 2, 1995
Samaa sukua, eri maata, MTV3, 1997
SunRadio, TV1, 1998
Salatut elämät, MTV3
Kotikatu, TV1
Käenpesä, MTV3

Comics
Tiskivuoro in Uusi Nainen -magazine ', art by Hannu Mänttäri
Scripts for Moomin related comics for Semic and ToTo-tuotanto, several artists
Pikku eläinpuoti in *Oma Ystävä -magazine, art by Hannu Mänttäri
Kimppakämppä in Trendi -magazine, art by Johanna Rojola
Several science fiction and fantasy themed comics from the year 1982 onwards, several artists

References

External links 

 

1958 births
Living people
20th-century Finnish novelists
21st-century Finnish novelists
Finlandia Prize winners
Finnish fantasy writers
Finnish science fiction writers
Finnish women novelists
Finnish women short story writers
Finnish short story writers
People from Sodankylä
People from Tampere
Women science fiction and fantasy writers
21st-century Finnish women writers
20th-century Finnish women writers